Abram Dannerly was a member of the South Carolina House of Representatives during the Reconstruction era. He represented Orangeburg. He was expelled in 1874.

References

Members of the South Carolina House of Representatives
Year of death missing